founded Aiful when he was a teenager; now Japan's fifth-largest consumer finance company. Residing in Tokyo, he is married with three children.

See also
List of billionaires

External links
Forbes.com: Forbes World's Richest People

1948 births
Living people
Japanese billionaires
20th-century Japanese businesspeople
21st-century Japanese businesspeople